The ISKCON Communications Journal (ICJ) was a biannual magazine of dialogue, focussing on issues related to missionary development in ISKCON (International Society for Krishna Consciousness) and with issues of communication, administration, social development and education which affected mission in ISKCON. ICJ also provided a forum for members of various communities to comment on ISKCON's development. It was  established in 1993 and was published by ISKCON Communications Europe until its last issue appeared in 2005.

The ICJ came to be regarded by scholars as ISKCON's intellectual magazine and published papers by a number of prominent scholars. British sociologist James Beckford saw the ICJ as an example of the contribution of religious movements to their own academic study. Beckford held that the magazine showed how "organic intellectuals" of ISKCON were discussing their research and ideas with scholars and in some cases conducting joint research. According to the Danish religious studies scholar Mikael Rothstein, the magazine was a means of internal communication in ISKCON, as well as forum for dialogue with academics. In his view, the magazine represented ISKCON's fundamental interest in good relations with the academic community.

The founder and commissioning editor of ICJ throughout its life was Shaunaka Rishi Das.

References

Bibliography 
Altglas, Véronique (2005), "Les mots brûlent»: sociologie des Nouveaux Mouvements Religieux et déontologie", Archives de sciences sociales des religions: 165-188
Beckford, James A. (2003), Social Theory and Religion, Cambridge, UK; New York: Cambridge University Press, 
Geertz, Armin W.; Warburg, Margit & Christensen, Dorthe R. (2008), New Religions and Globalization: Empirical, Theoretical and Methodological Perspectives, Aarhus: Aarhus University Press, 
Mayer, Jean-François (2004), "New Approaches to the Study of New Religions in North America and Europe", in Peter Antes, Armin W. Geertz, Randi R. Warne, New Approaches to the Study of Religion: Regional, Critical, and Historical Approaches, Berlin: Walter de Gruyter, pp. 407–436, 
Robbins, Thomas & Zablocki, Benjamin D. (2001), Misunderstanding cults: searching for objectivity in a controversial field, Toronto: University of Toronto Press, 
Rochford, E. Burke (2007), Hare Krishna Transformed, New York: New York University Press, 
Rothstein, Mikael (1996), Belief Transformations: Some Aspects of the Relation Between Science and Religion in Transcendental Meditation (TM) and the International Society for Krishna Consciousness (ISKCON), Aarhus: Aarhus University Press, 
Nye, Malory (2001), Multiculturalism and Minority Religions in Britain: Krishna Consciousness, Religious Freedom and the Politics of Location, Richmond, Surrey: Curzon Press,

External links 
 

Biannual magazines published in India
Defunct literary magazines
Defunct magazines published in India
English-language magazines published in India
Hindu magazines
Literary magazines published in India
International Society for Krishna Consciousness
Magazines established in 1994
Magazines disestablished in 2005
Religious magazines